Acanthosphaeria is a genus of fungi in the family Trichosphaeriaceae. The genus was circumscribed by Wilhelm Kirschstein in 1939.

References

Sordariomycetes genera
Trichosphaeriales